Aart van Asperen (born 16 August 1956) is a Dutch director, born in Utrecht. Van Asperen has directed several episodes of Dutch soaps Goede tijden, slechte tijden and Goudkust. He has also done work for charity organisations, such as Amnesty International.

References

External links
Home page (in Dutch)

Living people
1956 births
Dutch television directors
Mass media people from Utrecht (city)